Anatoly Luzgin (born 28 July 1931) is a retired Soviet coxswain who had his best achievements in the coxed fours, partnering with Vladimir Yevseyev, Anatoly Tkachuk, Boris Kuzmin and Vitaly Kurdchenko. In this event, they won two European titles and a silver medal at the 1966 World Rowing Championships; they finished in fifth place at the 1964 Summer Olympics.

References

External links
 
 
 

1931 births
Possibly living people
Olympic rowers of the Soviet Union
Rowers at the 1964 Summer Olympics
Soviet male rowers
World Rowing Championships medalists for the Soviet Union
Coxswains (rowing)
European Rowing Championships medalists